The Luxury Gap is the second studio album by English synth-pop band Heaven 17, released on 25 April 1983 by Virgin Records. It is the band's best-selling studio album, peaking at number 4 on the UK Albums Chart – eventually becoming the 17th best-selling album of the year – and being certified platinum (300,000 copies sold) by the BPI in 1984.

In contrast to Heaven 17's debut studio album Penthouse and Pavement (1981), the singles from The Luxury Gap charted strongly, particularly "Temptation", which reached number 2 in the UK Singles Chart and was the 34th biggest selling single of 1983. Other hits included "Come Live with Me" (UK number 5) and "Crushed by the Wheels of Industry" (UK number 17).

Recording
The Luxury Gap was recorded at AIR Studios in Oxford Street, London with co-producer Greg Walsh. It was recorded under the working title Ashes and Diamonds. The band's ambition was to combine their love of soul music with electronic music. Soul music was a particularly strong influence on the vocal arrangements, most notably on the song "Temptation", which became a hit single. Virgin Records did not require the band to work on a budget, which allowed them to write in the studio and to use the studio as a musical tool, creating complex and detailed arrangements and have three songs orchestrated.

Live performances
Heaven 17, in their current line-up of Martyn Ware and Glenn Gregory, performed all of The Luxury Gap on 14 October 2011 at the Roundhouse in London. The band performed the album using "3D sound" technology developed by Ware's Illustrious Company. The show was a sequel of sorts to the Penthouse and Pavement concerts the band played in 2010.

A new deluxe edition of the album in 2012 was promoted with a tour of the UK in October and November, followed by some December dates in Germany and Belgium. The band played the original album in its entirety, followed by a selection of Heaven 17 tracks and two Human League tracks: "A Crow and a Baby" and "Being Boiled". A cover version of "You've Lost That Lovin' Feeling", similar to the one recorded by the Human League in 1979, and a cover version of the Associates' "Party Fears Two" were also performed.

To commemorate the 35th anniversary of The Luxury Gaps release, Heaven 17 toured the UK from November to December 2018, again performing the album in full.

Track listing
All songs written and composed by Glenn Gregory, Ian Craig Marsh, and Martyn Ware.

Side one
"Crushed by the Wheels of Industry" – 5:54
"Who'll Stop the Rain" – 3:04
"Let Me Go" – 4:23
"Key to the World" – 3:42

Side two
"Temptation" – 3:34
"Come Live with Me" – 4:18
"Lady Ice and Mr Hex" – 3:46
"We Live So Fast" – 3:49
"The Best Kept Secret" – 5:09

The US Arista issue of the album omitted "Who'll Stop the Rain" and "Let Me Go", both of which had appeared on a US-only release titled Heaven 17 (featuring most tracks from Penthouse and Pavement) in 1982. They were replaced with re-recorded versions of "Let's All Make a Bomb" and "Song with No Name" (from Penthouse and Pavement, and released as B-sides in the UK).

2006 remastered edition bonus tracks
"Let Me Go" (extended mix) – 6:22
"Who'll Stop the Rain (Dub)" – 6:15
"Crushed by the Wheels of Industry (Parts 1 and 2)" – 6:59
"Come Live with Me" (12" version) – 4:34

Personnel
Credits are adapted from the album's liner notes.

Heaven 17
 Glenn Gregory – lead vocals, backing vocals
 Martyn Ware – synthesizer programming, Linn LM-1 drum machine, backing vocals, arrangements
 Ian Craig Marsh – synthesizer programming, arrangements

Additional musicians
 Nick Plytas – grand piano (1, 3, 7)
 Greg Walsh – acoustic piano and synthesizer programming (1, 4), arrangements
 John Wilson – guitars and guitar synthesizer (1, 2, 3, 7)
 Ray Russell – guitars and guitar synthesizer (2, 4, 6)
 Simon Phillips – drums and percussion (7, 9)
 Don Myrick – saxophones
 Louis Satterfield – trombone
 Michael Harris – trumpet
 Rahmlee Michael Davis – trumpet
 John Barker – orchestra arrangements and conductor (5, 6, 9)
 Sarah Gregory – "screams" (2)
 Carol Kenyon – backing vocals (4, 5)

Production
 Ian Craig Marsh – producer, engineer 
 Martyn Ware – producer, engineer 
 Greg Walsh – producer, engineer
 Ray Smith – cover concept, painting

Charts

Weekly charts

Year-end charts

Certifications

References

External links
 

1983 albums
Heaven 17 albums
Virgin Records albums